David Orr CBE, FREng, FICE, FIAE, (born 1953 in Belfast, Northern Ireland) is a civil engineer.  He was the 143rd President of the Institution of Civil Engineers.  He is married to Vyvienne and they have 2 children.

David Orr graduated from Queen's University Belfast in 1974 with an honours degree in civil engineering, and was awarded an MSc by Queen's in 1978.  He spent much of his career with Roads Service, Northern Ireland’s road authority, latterly serving as Permanent Secretary of the Department for Regional Development.

He currently chairs the Independent Assurance Panel (Procurement) for High Speed 2, is an external member of the Palace of Westminster Restoration and Renewal Programme Board, and also chairs the Institution of Civil Engineers Benevolent Fund. From 2008 to 2014 he chaired the Procurement Expert Panel for London's Crossrail.

In his Presidential Address, Orr encouraged civil engineers to:
 stand up for civil engineering - delivering public works of real value;
 stand up for professionalism - there to protect the public;
 stand up for excellence in procurement - the key to project success; and
 stand up for civil engineers - unsung heroes no more.

He listed as one of his unsung heroes William Bald, who between 1832 and 1842 constructed the Antrim Coast Road.

Awards and honours

2010	Commander of the Order of the British Empire
2009	Fellow of the Royal Academy of Engineering
2009	Gold Medal of the Institution of Civil Engineers
2007-08	President of the Institution of Civil Engineers
2007	Fellow of the Irish Academy of Engineering
2007	Fellow of the Institution of Highways and Transportation
2005	Chartered Environmentalist
2002	Fellow of the Institution of Civil Engineers
1990	Winston Churchill Fellow
1981	Member of the Institution of Civil Engineers and Chartered Civil Engineer
1978	MSc Civil Engineering, Queen's University Belfast
1974	BSc Civil Engineering with Honours, Queen's University Belfast

References

External links
The Institution of Civil Engineers
The Royal Academy of Engineering
Department of Finance and Personnel

        
        
        
        
        
        

Commanders of the Order of the British Empire
Presidents of the Institution of Civil Engineers
Fellows of the Royal Academy of Engineering
Alumni of Queen's University Belfast
1953 births
Living people
British civil engineers